Robert Houston Hamilton (December 25, 1873 – June 15, 1946) was an American college football coach, law professor, and judge. He was the first head football coach at Baylor University, serving from 1899 to 1900 and compiling a record of 5–1–1.

Hamilton graduated from Baylor's law department in 1899 and joined the faculty of Baylor Law School in 1900. After leaving Baylor, he moved to Port Lavaca, Texas, where he served as a county judge before attending the University of Chicago. In 1921, he was elected to the Texas Supreme Court. Hamilton  died on June 15, 1946, at his home in Port Lavaca.

Head coaching record

References

External links
 

1873 births
1946 deaths
Baylor Bears football coaches
Baylor Law School alumni
Baylor University faculty
Justices of the Texas Supreme Court
University of Chicago alumni
People from Corsicana, Texas
People from Port Lavaca, Texas
Coaches of American football from Texas